Croce e delizia is a live album from Italian rock band Litfiba. It was recorded in 1997 and released in 1998.

Personnel
Piero Pelù - Vocals
Ghigo Renzulli - Guitars
Daniele Bagni - Bass
Roberto Terzani - Keyboards
Franco Caforio - Drums

Litfiba albums
1998 live albums
Italian-language live albums